Thomas Joseph Finn (November 21, 1948 – June 27, 2020) was an American musician and DJ.  He was a founding member of the 1960s baroque pop group The Left Banke, on bass and vocals.

Early career

Finn was a founder member of The Left Banke in 1965, alongside Michael Brown, Steve Martin, George Cameron and Warren David-Schierhorst.   After initial success with the songs "Walk Away Renée" and "Pretty Ballerina", the group split up, though Finn was involved in later reformations of the band.

Later career
After the Left Banke disbanded, Finn went on to become an engineer at Bell Sound Studios, as well as working with jazz drummer Buddy Rich at Rich's night club Buddy's Place as stage manager and MC.

In 1982, Studio 54 owner Steve Rubell convinced Finn to try his hand as a DJ. This led to Finn working at NY clubs such as The Palladium, The Red Zone, and Au Bar. In the 1990s Finn began working as a DJ for private events, resulting in his own company, Topspin Entertainment.   Finn was the DJ for the White House Millennium Gala, hosted by President Bill Clinton and Hillary Clinton. In 2006, he appeared in the November issue of Town & Country magazine in a five-page spread called "The Party Masters". Finn was featured in a New York Times (December 16, 2006) article "The D.J. Who Moves the Movers and Shakers".

Death
Finn died on June 27, 2020, after a period of ill health.

References

External links 
DJ Tom Finn
 

American rock musicians
DJs from New York City
2020 deaths
1948 births
Musicians from New York City